Hugo Wentges (born 11 February 2002) is a Dutch professional footballer who plays as a goalkeeper for Eerste Divisie club ADO Den Haag and the Netherlands national U21 team.

Club career
Wentges started the 2021–22 season as a back-up at ADO Den Haag but after first choice goalkeeper Luuk Koopmans suffered a serious shoulder injury, Wentges made his debut appearances in the Eerste Divisie. Ahead of the 2022–23 season Wentges was given the number 1 shirt number, and a new contract until 2025.

International career
In May 2022, Wentges received his first call up to the Netherlands national under-21 football team. Wentges made his U21 debut on 7 June 2022 when he started in goal against Gibraltar in a 6–0 win.

Career statistics

References 

2002 births
Living people
Dutch footballers
Footballers from Leiden
Netherlands youth international footballers
Netherlands under-21 international footballers
ADO Den Haag players
Eerste Divisie players
Association football goalkeepers